The 2016 Pac-12 Conference football season is the sixth season for the conference as a twelve-team league. The season began on August 26, 2016, with California vs. Hawaii. The final game was the 2016 Pac-12 Football Championship Game at Levi's Stadium on December 2, 2016, with Fox televising the game.

Previous season
Stanford defeated USC 41–22 for the 2015 Pac-12 Conference Football Championship.

Ten teams participated in bowl games. Arizona defeated New Mexico 45–37 in the Gildan New Mexico Bowl. Utah was a winner over BYU at the Roal Purple Las Vegas Bowl. Washington State was a 20-14 winner over Miami in the Hyundai Sun Bowl. In the Zaxby's Heart of Dallas Bowl, it was Washington 44 Southern Miss 31. UCLA lost to Nebraska 29–37 in the Foster Farms Bowl. California defeated Air Force 55–36 in the Lockheed Martin Armed Forces Bowl. Wisconsin was a winner over USC 23–21 in the National Funding Holiday Bowl. Stanford defeated Iowa 45–16 in the Rose Bowl Game. Oregon lost to TCU in the Valero Alamo Bowl 41–47. Arizona State lost to West Virginia 42–43 in the Motel 6 Cactus Bowl.

Pre-season
2016 Pac-12 Spring Football and number of signees on signing day:

North Division
California – 25 signees
Oregon – 19 signees
Oregon State – 24 signees
Stanford – 30 signees
Washington – 18 signees
Washington State – 25 signees 	 

South Division  
Arizona – 22 signees
Arizona State – 18 signees
Colorado –18 signees
UCLA – 27 signees
USC – 13 signees
Utah – 24 signees

Pac-12 Media 
The Pac-12 conducted its annual media days at the Loews Hollywood Hotel, – The Loews Hollywood Hotel in Hollywood, California between July 14 and July 15. The event commenced with a speech by Pac-12 commissioner Larry Scott, and all 12 teams sent their head coaches and two selected players to speak with members of the media. The event along with all speakers and interviews were broadcast live on the Pac-12 Network. The teams and representatives in respective order were as follows:

Thursday
Arizona – Head Coach Rich Rodriguez, Nate Phillips, WR & Sani Fuimaono, DL 
California – Head Coach Sonny Dykes, Steven Moore, OT & DeVante Wilson, DE
 Oregon – Head Coach Mark Helfrich, Royce Freeman, RB & Johnny Ragin, LB
Washington State – Head Coach Mike Leach, Gabe Marks, WR & Parker Henry, LB
 Utah – Head Coach Kyle Whittingham, JJ Dielman, OT & Justin Thomas, DB

Friday
Arizona State – Head Coach Todd Graham, Tim White, WR/KR & Tashon Smallwood, DL
Oregon State – Head Coach Gary Andersen, Victor Bolden, WR & Nick Porebski, P
UCLA – Head Coach Jim Mora, Conor McDermott, OT & Jayon Brown, LB
Stanford – Head Coach David Shaw, Christian McCaffrey, RB & Solomon Thomas, DE
Washington – Head Coach Chris Petersen, Darrell Daniels, TE & Kevin King, DB
 Colorado – Head Coach Mike MacIntyre, Sefo Liufau, QB & Chidobe Awuzie, CB

Preseason Media Polls
Pac-12 Championship Game Voting

North Division
 1. Stanford Cardinal (24 pts., 186 votes)
 2. Washington Huskies (8 pts., 163 votes)
 3. Oregon Ducks (1 pt., 132 votes)
 4. Washington State Cougars (112 votes)
 5. California Golden Bears (67 votes)
 6. Oregon State Beavers (33 votes)

South Division
 1. UCLA Bruins (19 pts., 180 votes)
 2. USC Trojans (12 pts., 173 votes)
 3. Utah Utes (2 pts., 127 votes)
 4. Arizona Wildcats (87 votes)
 5. Arizona State Sun Devils (85 votes)
 6. Colorado Buffaloes (63 votes)

 Predicted Pac-12 Championship Game Winner: Stanford Cardinal (20 points) was picked to win the Pac-12 Championship over UCLA (19) for the first time since 1960. Others receiving votes were Washington, ASU (3), USC (2), Oregon (1) and Utah (2).

References:

Recruiting classes

Head coaches

Coaching changes
There were no coaching changes following the 2016 season.

Coaches

Note: Stats shown are before the beginning of the season

Rankings

Schedule

All times Mountain time.  Pac-12 teams in bold.

Rankings reflect those of the AP poll for that week.

Week 1

Players of the Week – Sept 5

Week 2

Players of the Week- Sept 12

Week 3

Players of the Week – Sept 19

Week 4

Players of the Week – Sept 26

Week 5

Players of the Week – Oct 3

Week 6

   

Players of the Week – Oct 10

Week 7

Players of the Week – Oct 17

Week 8

Players of the Week – Oct 24

Week 9

Players of the Week – Oct 31

Week 10

Players of the Week – Nov 7

Week 11

Players of the Week – Nov 14

Week 12

Players of the Week – Nov 21

Week 13

Players of the Week – Nov 28

Championship game

The championship game will played on December 2, 2016. It featured the teams with the best conference records from each division, Washington from the North and Colorado from the South.  This was the sixth championship game (and the sixth win for the North), with both Washington and Colorado appearing for the first time.

Week 14 (Pac-12 Championship Game)

Pac-12 vs Power Conference matchups

This is a list of the power conference teams (ACC, Big 10, Big 12 and SEC along with independents Notre Dame and BYU) the Pac-12 plays in the non-conference (Rankings from the AP Poll):

Records against other conferences
2016 records against non-conference foes: 

Regular Season

Post Season

Postseason

Bowl games

* Rankings based on CFP rankings, Pac-12 team is bolded

Selection of teams:
Bowl eligible: Colorado, Stanford, USC, Utah, Washington, Washington State
Bowl-ineligible: Arizona, Arizona State, California, Oregon, Oregon State, UCLA

All-Pac-12 Individual Awards 

The following individuals won the conference's annual player and coach awards:

All-Conference teams
The following players earned All-Pac-12 honors.

Offense:

Defense:

Specialists:

Honorable Mentions
ARIZONA: AP/ST Samajie Grant, Sr.; WR Nate Phillips, Sr.; WR Trey Griffey, Sr.
ARIZONA STATE: WR N'Keal Harry, Fr.; LB Viliami (Laiu) Moeakiola, Sr.
CALIFORNIA: PK Matt Anderson, Jr.; DL James Looney, Jr.; OL Steven Moore, Sr.; RB Khalfani Muhammad, Sr.; QB Davis Webb, Sr.
COLORADO: WR Bryce Bobo, Jr.; DL, Jordan Carrell, Sr.; WR Shay Fields, Jr.; OL Alex Kelley, Sr.; OL Gerrad Kough, Jr.; QB Sefo Liufau, Sr.; LB Kenneth Olugbode, Sr.; WR Devin Ross, Jr.; DL Josh Tupou, Sr.
OREGON: LB Troy Dye, Fr.; RB Royce Freeman, Jr.; OL Jake Hanson, Fr.; TE Johnny Mundt, Sr.; RS Charles Nelson, Jr.; OL Calvin Throckmorton, Fr.; K Matt Wogan, Sr.
OREGON STATE: DB Xavier Crawford, Fr.; DB Treston Decoud, Sr.; OL Gus Lavaka Fr.; RB Ryan Nall, So.
STANFORD: LB Joey Alfieri, Jr.; P Jake Bailey, So.; DB Dallas Lloyd, Sr.; RB Bryce Love, So.; RS Christian McCaffrey, Jr.; DB Quenton Meeks, So.; LB Kevin Palma, Sr.; Harrison Phillips, Jr.; DB Justin Reid, So.; TE Dalton Schultz, Jr.; ST Brandon Simmons, Jr.; PK Conrad Ukropina, Sr.
UCLA: WR Darren Andrews, Jr.; DB Randall Goforth, Sr.; Fabian Moreau, Sr.; DL Eddie Vanderdoes, Jr.; DB Jaleel Wadood, Jr. 
USC: QB Sam Darnold, RSFr.; DL Rasheem Green, So.; DL Porter Gustin, So.; DB Chris Hawkins, Jr.; LB Michael Hutchings, Sr.; TE Daniel Imatorbhebhe, RSFr.; DB Iman Marshall, So.; Leon McQuay III, Sr.; WR Darreus Rogers, Sr.
UTAH: DB Chase Hansen, So.; DL Lowell Lotulelei, Jr.; DL Filipo Mokofisi, Jr.; DL Pasoni Tasini, Sr.; DL Pita Taumoepenu, Sr.; RB Joe Williams, Sr.
WASHINGTON: TE Darrell Daniels, Sr.; DL Greg Gaines, So.; DB Kevin King, Sr.; TE Drew Sample, So.; LB Psalm Wooching, Sr. 
WASHINGTON STATE: WR River Cracraft, Sr.; OL Cole Madison, Jr.; RB Jamal Morrow, Jr.; OL Cody O'Connell, Jr.; LB Peyton Pelluer, Jr.; OL Riley Sorenson, Sr.

All-Americans
The following Pac-12 players were named to the 2016 College Football All-America Team by the Walter Camp Football Foundation (WCFF), Associated Press (AP), Football Writers Association of america (FWAA), Sporting News (SN), and American Football Coaches Association (AFCA):
First team

Second team

Third team

Academic All-America Team Member of the Year (CoSIDA)

All-Academic
First team

Individual awards

Home game attendance

Bold – Exceed capacity
†Season High

Attendance for neutral site games:
August 26 – Cal vs. Hawaii, 61,247
September 2 – Colorado vs. Colorado State, 69,850
September 3 – Arizona vs. BYU, 50,528
September 3 – USC vs Alabama, 81,359
December 2 – Colorado vs Washington, 47,118

References